

People
Frederick J. Conboy (1883–1949), Canadian politician
Tim Conboy (born 1982), American hockey player
Kevin Conboy (born 1987), Danish football player
Martin Thomas Conboy Jr. (1878–1944), American attorney, including U.S. Attorney for the Southern District of New York

Places
Conboy Lake National Wildlife Refuge at Mount Adams